The 1973 European Cup was the 4th edition of the European Cup of athletics.

The Finals were held in Edinburgh, Scotland.

Final
Held in Edinburgh on 8–9 September (men) and 7 September (women).

Team standings

Results summary

Men's events

Women's events

Semifinals

Men
All semifinals were held on 4 and 5 August. First two teams advanced to the final.

Semifinal 1
Held in Oslo, Norway

Semifinal 2
Held in Celje, Yugoslavia

Semifinal 3
Held in Nice, Switzerland

Women
All semifinals were held on 4 August. First two teams advanced to the final.

Semifinal 1
Held in Warsaw, Poland

Semifinal 2
Held in Bucharest, Romania

Semifinal 3
Held in Sittard, Netherlands

Preliminaries

Men
All preliminaries were held on 30 June and 1 July. First two teams advanced to the semifinals.

Preliminary 1
Held in Lisbon, Portugal

Preliminary 2
Held in Brussels, Belgium

Preliminary 3
Held in Athenes, Greece

Women
All preliminaries were held on 30 June and 1 July. First three teams advanced to the semifinals.

Preliminary 1
Held in Lyngby, Denmark

Preliminary 2
Held in Rijeka, Yugoslavia

References

External links
European Cup results (Men) from GBR Athletics
European Cup results (Women) from GBR Athletics

European Cup (athletics)
European Cup
European Cup (athletics)
European Cup (athletics)
International athletics competitions hosted by Scotland
International sports competitions in Edinburgh
European Cup (athletics), 1973